Laura Elsie Dickinson (born September 23, 1979) is an American musician and actress from California who is a vocalist for featured songs on the Disney Channel's programs Phineas and Ferb, Sofia the First, and Jake and the Never Land Pirates. On December 12, 2014, she released her debut album, One for My Baby – To Frank Sinatra with Love, on Music & Mirror Records in celebration of Frank Sinatra's 99th birthday and centennial year.

Career
Growing up in Los Angeles, Dickinson began studying piano, tap, ballet and acrobatics at age three. Her first recording session was at age five. Her mother is a singer and classical pianist, while her father was a singer who founded Buffalo Springfield Again with Buffalo Springfield members Dewey Martin and Bruce Palmer.

She began long affiliation with the Walt Disney Company in 1995. In 2001, she met Deke Sharon and founded the a cappella group Groove 66 at Disney's California Adventure theme park. She also began directing, arranging, and co-producing the group in 2004 under the name Vybration.

Since 2004, Dickinson has been the Principal Vocalist and Vocal Contractor for Pageant of the Masters in Laguna Beach, California. This job led to her meeting Danny Jacob, a guitarist, composer, and producer. They collaborated on The Emperor's New School and on demos for the TV series Phineas and Ferb. Dickinson was a voice actor and vocalist for the series from 2007–2015.

In 2007, she joined the music group Spiritualized on their Acoustic Mainlines tour, which ended at the Coachella Valley Music and Arts Festival. She sang background vocals on their album, Sweet Heart Sweet Light (2012), and toured with them throughout North America in May 2012. Their Huh? tour included an appearance on Late Night with David Letterman and concluded with headlining the Sasquatch! Music Festival. She has been the opening act for Lyle Lovett and Tony Bennett. In 2016, Dickinson began working with Alan Chang as Michael Bublé's vocal contractor. She directed the choir on his album Nobody but Me and is the featured vocalist on the first song, "I Believe In You."

In 2019, she sang on the track "THE WAY IT USED TO BE" from the Watchmen (soundtrack).

External links
 Official website

References

1979 births
Living people
Actresses from California
American voice actresses
People from Azusa, California
Singers from California
21st-century American actresses
21st-century American singers
21st-century American women singers